The Iranian football league system is a series of interconnected leagues for football clubs in Iran.

Structure
The current structure has been in place since 2001. The Persian Gulf Pro League (PGL) is the highest level of club football in Iran. It is also called the Pro League. Below it is the Azadegan League, also known as the 1st division and called the League 1, which consists of one twenty-team group. One level further down from that is the 2nd division, also known as a League 2 which is made up of 40 teams evenly distributed into four groups. One step down, and the final nationwide league, is the 3rd division, also known as a League 3. This level has five groups and 60 teams. Each groups contains teams that are located in the same area of the nation. The final level of the football system consists of 31 provincial leagues. Local teams from each province participate in these leagues, and some of the leagues are divided into further divisions.

The system works with a promotion-relegation system, meaning that a team from the lowest level of the system can make it to the top level after a number of years. The number of teams in each league often changes from season to season, due to the lack of any professional management in the lower levels of the system. Currently the IPL is the only league that is considered professional, despite many of its rules about club facilities and management being broken. It is not uncommon for teams in the lower levels of the system to change team names because of sponsorship issues or for teams to completely withdraw from a competition.

The top four levels of the system are managed by the Iranian football federation, while the bottom level leagues are managed by their respective provincial football committee.

League system changes

History

Before 1970
Before the 1970s, Iran did not have an official national football league. Most clubs participated in championships of their city or province. Therefore the champion of the Tehran Premier League was seen as the Iranian football champion. Due to their achievements in the Tehran Premier League, Shahin Tehran and Taj, today known as Esteghlal, were the most popular teams at this time. Also Daraei and PAS Tehran were successful clubs in Tehran's own league.

Local League

In 1970, the Local League was created. For the first time, the league comprised also teams from many other cities and provinces including Sepahan from Isfahan and East Azerbaijan's famous club Tractor. The first recognized Iranian football champion was Taj after beating PAS Tehran 2–1 in the final of the 1970–71 Local League. The incidents of the semi-final between Taj and Persepolis are also of great importance for the rivalry between both clubs. The second and last edition of the Local League was won by Persepolis.

Takht Jamshid Cup

In 1972, the Takht Jamshid Cup was founded as the national league and included teams from all over the country. The Iranian Football Federation had decided to create a league similar to European football leagues. The league was named after Takht-e Jamshid, the ancient Achaemenid capital known outside of Iran as Persepolis. The Takht Jamshid Cup comprised twelve clubs in the 1973–74 season. Persepolis became the first champions of the Takht Jamshid Cup, two points ahead of rival Taj.

Before the beginning of the 1974–75 season, the number of teams were increased from twelve to 16 teams. Esteghlal claimed its first Takht Jamshid Cup title after winning the league ahead of Persepolis. The 1975–76 Takht Jamshid Cup was won by Persepolis with a great performance by Iranian football legend Ali Parvin. The second place team was another Tehran based club, Homa. The next two seasons were won by PAS Tehran under coach Hassan Habibi. PAS Tehran won their championships both times ahead of Persepolis. At this time the Takht Jamshid Cup was one of the strongest football leagues in Asia. The Iran national football team won in 1976 their third successive AFC Asian Cup and qualified 1978 for the FIFA World Cup for the first time in the country's history.

The 1978–79 Takht Jamshid Cup season was abandoned due to the 1979 Revolution. Shahbaz was leading the league after twelve matchdays ahead of Persepolis and Taj.

1979 Revolution and 1980s
Due to the Islamic Revolution and the Iran–Iraq War, the Takht Jamshid Cup was dissolved and also the lower leagues were unorganized. Once again the champion of the Tehran Province League was seen as the Iranian football champion. The league was dominated by Persepolis with five titles and Esteghlal with two championships. In 1987 the 17th of Shahrivar league was created with mainly teams from Tehran, but also with clubs from some others cities. The league was won by Persepolis ahead of Daraei. Due to the fact that the league was part of the Tehran Province League, Persepolis' title is today not accepted as a national championship.

Qods League

In 1989 the Qods League was formed as the national Iranian football league. The first official Iranian football champion since the revolution was Esteghlal. After only one season the Qods League was abolished.

Azadegan League

In 1991 the Azadegan League was formed as the top flight of Iranian football. The league was named as Azadegan League in honor of the Iranian prisoners of war who were released. Azadegan means the liberated in Persian. The league started with a format of 12 teams in the first season. In the 1992–93 Azadegan League season the league changed its format. 16 clubs participated in two groups of eight teams. PAS Tehran were the champions in both seasons.
Esteghlal relegated for the first time in their history in 1993. Before the start of the 1993–94 season, the league changed its format again. 14 teams participated in one group. Saipa won the Azadegan League title, sitting three points of runners-up Persepolis. Only one year later the league format was changed again. 24 clubs participated in two groups of 12 teams. Saipa defended their title in final against Esteghlal.

Prior to the start of the 1995–96 Azadegan League season, the league changed its format again. 16 teams participated in one group until 1999. Persepolis were the champions in 1995–96, 1996–97 and 1998–99, while Esteghlal became the champion in the 1997–98 season. In 1999 the league was reduced to 14 teams. Persepolis won the 1999–2000 Azadegan League season, sitting seven points clear of rival Esteghlal. The 2000–01 season was the last year of the Azadegan League as the top-level football league of Iran. Esteghlal became the champion in a league of 12 teams.

Iran Pro League

The 2001–2002 season saw the beginning of the first professional football league in Iran. Unfortunately many say that the new league is professional in name only and is missing many of the required components of a pro league. Player salaries have risen significantly and other positives in the league are the emergence of provincial teams and raw talent which every IPL team boasts. Teams like Foolad Sepahan, Foolad Khouzestan, Zob Ahan FC and Esteghlal Ahvaz have all shown they can compete, even though they are not based in Tehran. The league can only continue to get better, and many are hoping this league will help Iran's football, in terms of improving quality and reputation.

On 12 August 2006, the Iranian Football Federation decided to change the name of the league once again. The name of the league was initially the Persian Gulf Cup which later changed to the current name Persian Gulf Pro League. This was done to promote the name of the Persian Gulf, instead of the many variations which some nations and organizations use which Iran claims are incorrect. The league logo was also changed, with the winner being selected from over 130 designs and unveiled on 14 November 2006.
They continued to get better steady and slowly which made many people criticize that the league is sometimes stepping backwards. Saipa was the 6th team to win the 6th new edition of the league which meant 6 different teams won 6 leagues in the row. But in 2008 Persepolis regained the title after 6 years by the dramatic win again the rival Sepahan on the 96th minute of the final match and become the first team that won two titles in the new edition of the Iranian League. The next season Esteghlal did the same thing and won the league for second time on the final matchday. Then, Sepahan dominated the league by winning the title in three consecutive seasons. Currently Sepahan holds the Iran Pro League title record with four previous titles and they recently added a fifth to their trophy case with the 2014–15 season championship.

Notes
1. Taj changed its name to Esteghlal in 1979.
2. Shahin changed its name to Persepolis in 1968, which in turn changed to Piroozi in 1986; but the 'old' name Persepolis is still used in preference to Piroozi in Iran.
3. Azadegan League is now the name of the 2nd highest division in Iran, only the IPL is higher.

Championships
The number of national championships attained by football clubs in Iran since 1970. The national championships were suspended from 1979 to 1991.

Current system

Men's

Note: 3rd division second stagec contains 10 qualified teams from 1st stage, 16 teams which have remained from previous season of 3rd division 2nd stage and 4 relegated teams from previous season of 2nd division (totally 30 teams).

Women's

See also 
 Persian Gulf Pro League
 Azadegan League
 2nd Division
 3rd Division
 League system
 Hazfi Cup
 Iranian Super Cup
 Kowsar Women Football League
 Iranian Futsal Super League
 Iran Premier Beach Soccer League

References

 
Football league systems in Asia